U.S. Route 93 in the state of Arizona is a United States Numbered Highway that begins in Wickenburg and heads north to the Nevada state line at the Mike O'Callaghan–Pat Tillman Memorial Bridge.

As part of a proposal by municipal leaders in Nevada and Arizona, the highway could be replaced by Interstate 11 (I-11).

Route description

It heads towards the northwest from this junction to an intersection with SR 89 (former US 89) across the Maricopa – Yavapai county line just northwest of town. SR 89 heads northeast to Prescott while US 93 continues its northwesterly heading, as a mainly two-lane highway with passing lanes every few miles. US 93 continues to the northwest to a junction with SR 71 at a diamond interchange southwest of Congress. As it continues to the northwest through this scenic but remote rural area, the highway is known as the Joshua Forest Parkway of Arizona.

The highway widens to four lanes at the Santa Maria River and continues towards the northwest past a junction with SR 97 on its way to the town of Wikieup.

After passing through Wikieup, US 93 curves north to follow the western edge of the Big Sandy River and one of its tributaries, Knight Creek, on its way toward Interstate 40 (I-40).

At I-40's exit 71, US 93 merges with the Interstate freeway and shares the same alignment heading west until they reach Kingman. The two split in Kingman with I-40 heading towards the south to skirt the southern end of the Black Mountains before curving west and into California and US 93 heading northwest towards Las Vegas. A project is currently underway to design and builds a free-flowing connection between I-40 and US 93 in the western section of Kingman, to avoid the current diamond interchange (exit 48) at Beale Street and the approximately one-mile section of congested, undivided roadway that US 93 motorists must navigate before the road widens back into a four-lane divided facility.

Northwest of Kingman and just over Coyote Pass, US 93 has an interchange with SR 68 (exit 67). This junction incorporates a large Commercial Vehicle Inspection Station (CVIS), which ADOT calls a "Port of Entry" (POE), for southbound and eastbound commercial traffic. Highway 68 heads west over the Black Mountains to Davis Dam, Laughlin, and Bullhead City (the latter via SR 95), while US 93 continues as a four-lane divided route towards the northwest. Running through the long Detrital Valley, with the Black Mountains to the west and the Cerbat Mountains and then the White Hills to the east, US 93 passes several small settlements in this most remote area. As it nears the Nevada state line, it enters the Lake Mead National Recreation Area and climbs over Householder Pass, before crossing into Nevada via the Mike O'Callaghan–Pat Tillman Memorial Bridge over the Black Canyon just downstream of the Colorado River from Hoover Dam.

US 93 continues into Nevada to the cities of Boulder City, Henderson and Las Vegas as part of Interstate 11 (I-11).

History

The route between Kingman and Hoover Dam first became part of the state highway system in 1934 when it was designated as SR 69. At the time, Hoover Dam was still under construction and the highway did not link to Nevada. The dam was completed the following year in 1935 enabling traffic to cross over the top of the dam.  In that year, US 466 was designated over SR 69 from Kingman to Hoover Dam. US 93 was extended south from (then) US 91 at Glendale, Nevada later the same year.

In 1935, Arizona proposed an extension of US 93 from Kingman to Ash Fork, overlapping US 66, and then south to Phoenix. This proposal was protested by the towns of Aguila and Wickenburg that argued that US 93 should pass through their towns rather than the proposed alignment to the east. The town of Wickenburg contested that a direct routing between Phoenix and Kingman would be  shorter than the routing through Ash Fork and that it would provide a necessary connection between Phoenix, the state capital and the northwestern part of the state. Until 1937, the originally proposed extension overlapping US 66 stayed in planning as US 93T. Another route, US 193, was also planned, traveling from Phoenix through Sacaton and Casa Grande before terminating in Picacho. US 193 was briefly reworked under the designation US 93A before the proposal was abandoned in 1937.

On March 23, 1946, what would become the southern leg of US 93 past Kingman was added to the State Highway System as State Route 93. Between 1942 and 1958, the highway was rebuilt and reworked into a suitable highway for an eventual extension of US 93. Though the state wanted US 93 to be extended over all of SR 93 through Phoenix, Casa Grande and Tucson to the Mexico border in Nogales, a southern extension was only accepted by the AASHTO to US 89 north of Wickenburg in 1965. The rest of SR 93 kept its state route designation until 1984.

Until 1992, US 93 ended a short distance north of Wickenburg, Arizona at a junction with U.S. Route 89. When US 89 was decommissioned in the area, the US 93 designation was carried on into Wickenburg.

Between 2006 and 2012, several widening projects were completed on the section between Wickenburg and Interstate 40.

New bypass bridge

US 93 (with US 60 to the southeast of Wickenburg) is the shortest route between the fast-growing cities of Las Vegas and Phoenix, two of the largest cities in the Southwest (and is an officially designated portion of the CANAMEX Corridor). Upgrades of US 60 and US 93 to four-lane freeway status are scheduled between Las Vegas and Phoenix; as of 2019, most sections north of the Santa Maria River are already at four-lane expressway status (with some of the newest portions presumably built to Interstate standards) with construction ongoing. This routing is part of Interstate 11 (I-11) which is connected with Interstate 215 (I-215), Interstate 515 (I-515), U.S. Route 95 (US 95) and State Route 564 (former SR 146) at the Henderson Spaghetti Bowl (also known as the "Hender-Bender") interchange in Henderson, Nevada and will connect Interstate 10 in Tonopah.

A segment of this new highway consists of a new route across the Colorado River called the Hoover Dam Bypass. The new crossing is the Mike O'Callaghan–Pat Tillman Memorial Bridge, the first so-called concrete-steel composite arch bridge built in the United States.

The bypass replaced the old section of US 93 that approached and crossed directly over Hoover Dam, which was inadequate by modern standards because there was one narrow lane in each direction, including several hairpin turns, many dangerous curves, and poor sight distances. Also, in the wake of the September 11, 2001 attacks, truck traffic over the Hoover Dam had been diverted south to a river crossing near Laughlin, Nevada via State Route 68, State Route 163 in Nevada and US 95, to safeguard the dam from hazardous spills or explosions.

Junction list

Notes

Special routes
US 93 has two special/bannered routes within the state of Arizona.

Hoover Dam temporary route

The route was originally part of the US 93 segment that travelled over Hoover Dam. It was redesignated as SR 93X on January 1, 2011 following the completion of the Hoover Dam Bypass. Unlike most unrelinquished sections of U.S. Highways in Arizona, the old Hoover Dam route was given a state route designation instead of a U.S. Highway one. SR 93X is not related in any way to SR 93, which was the original designation of US 93 between Kingman and Wickenburg, as well as a failed extension of US 93 from Wickenburg to Nogales. The route begins at the Nevada state line on the Hoover Dam, heading southeast, before switch-backing up a hillside at the southeastern end of the dam. The route proceeds southeasterly along Kingman Wash Access Road, crossing under US 93 less than a mile from the lookout. Approximately  from its western terminus, SR 93 arrives at a freeway interchange with US 93, which also serves as its eastern terminus. Currently, the majority of SR 93X is gated off to public traffic. The western first  of the route and Arizona side of the Hoover Dam are still accessible to public traffic, but can only be reached via US 93, SR 172 and Hoover Dam Access Road through Nevada. There is currently no open road for motorists to leave the Arizona side of the Dam, whilst remaining in the state.

Major intersections

Kingman spur route

Originally a small section of US 66, it became part of the Kingman I-40 Business Loop (I-40 BL) on October 26, 1984 upon the decommissioning of the former highway in Arizona. The majority of I-40 BL was retired to the city of Kingman in 2002, with two sections, each less than a mile long, remaining under ADOT ownership at I-40 exits 48 and 53 respectively. On September 18, 2009, the I-40 BL designation was decommissioned. The two remaining segments owned by ADOT became a minor southwestern extension of SR 66 and a new route designated US 93 Spur. US 93 Spur begins at an intersection with I-40 and US 93 at Beale Street and I-40 exit 48. The unsigned spur route continues west on Beale Street, ending about three blocks east of I-40 and US 93 at an intersection with "Route 66", Grandview Avenue and Beale Street in front of Locomotive Park.

Major intersections

References

External links

93
 Arizona
Transportation in Maricopa County, Arizona
Transportation in Yavapai County, Arizona
Transportation in Mohave County, Arizona